The Tengku Tengah Zaharah Mosque or the Floating Mosque is the first real floating mosque in Malaysia. It is situated in Kuala Ibai Lagoon near the estuary of Kuala Ibai River, 4 km from Kuala Terengganu Town. Construction began in 1993 and finished in 1995. The mosque was officially opened in July 1995 by  Almarhum Sultan Mahmud Al-Muktafi Billah Shah, the late Sultan of Terengganu. The mosque combines modern and Moorish architecture; incorporating the use of marble, ceramics, mosaic works and bomanite paving. The white structure of the mosque covers an area of roughly 5 acres and can accommodate up to 2000 attendees at a time. The architect of this mosque is Dato Ahmad Samsuri Mokhtar.

See also 

 List of mosques in Asia
 Kuala Terengganu
 Islamic Heritage Park
 Islam in Malaysia

References

Mosques in Terengganu
1995 establishments in Malaysia
Mosques completed in 1995
Mosque buildings with domes